Casino Drive (foaled March 7, 2005 in Kentucky, died August 5, 2019) is an American thoroughbred racehorse.

Background
Casino Drive was sired by 2003 United States Horse of the Year Mineshaft, out of the broodmare Better Than Honour, making him a half-brother to 2006 Belmont Stakes winner Jazil, and a three-quarter brother to 2007 Belmont Stakes winner Rags to Riches.

Purchased for $950,000 at the Keeneland September yearling sales and shipped to Japan by owner Hidetoshi Yamamoto, he was unraced until his three-year-old year.

Racing career
Casino Drive made his debut in February on the turf at Kyoto, winning by 11 lengths under Yutaka Take.

Following his maiden win, he was shipped to the United States where, in his second career start, he won the Grade II Peter Pan Stakes by 5 lengths. He was ridden by Kent Desormeaux, rider of 2008 Kentucky Derby and Preakness winner Big Brown.

Casino Drive was scratched from the Belmont and unable to run due to a stone bruise to his left rear hoof.

After a lengthy wait for his return after the Belmont, Casino Drive was started in an allowance race in the fall season to qualify for the Breeders' Cup Classic, easily beating the field. Expected to give a good run for the $5 million Classic, Casino Drive, unbeaten in his three previous starts, was last after setting the pace mid-race. He ended his 2008 campaign with a 6th place finish in the Japan Cup Dirt. The winner Kane Heliki, won his second Japan Cup Dirt title.

External links
 Pedigree and Partial Stats
 Casino Drive AlexBrownRacing

References

2005 racehorse births
Racehorses bred in Kentucky
Racehorses trained in the United States
Racehorses trained in Japan
Thoroughbred family 8-f